Gökçeis a village in the Kâhta District, Adıyaman Province, Turkey. The village is populated by Kurds of the Mirdêsî tribe and had a population of 212 in 2021.

The hamlet of Avnik is attached to the village.

References

Villages in Kâhta District
Kurdish settlements in Adıyaman Province